Cheh is both a given name and a surname. Notable people with the name include:

Chang Cheh (1923–2002), Hong Kong filmmaker, screenwriter, lyricist, and producer
Mary Cheh (born 1950), American politician

See also
Che (surname)
Chen (surname)
Cholesterol-5,6-oxide hydrolase, an enzyme